Facundo Bagnis and Ariel Behar were the defending champions but only Bagnis chose to defend his title, partnering Franco Agamenone. Bagnis lost in the first round to Sander Gillé and Joran Vliegen.

Guido Andreozzi and Guillermo Durán won the title after defeating Gillé and Vliegen 6–2, 6–7(6–8), [10–8] in the final.

Seeds

Draw

References
 Main draw

Punta Open - Doubles
Tennis tournaments in Uruguay
Punta Open